Francey is a Swiss German surname. Notable people with the surname include:
David Francey (born 1954), Canadian folk singer-songwriter
Micheline Francey (1919–1969), French film actress
Peter Francey, Canadian music manager

German-language surnames
Surnames of Swiss origin